Stardium is a Turkish record label, founded on June 15, 2002. The artists from Stardium include the popular Group Hepsi and Murat Boz. The label has gained other success other than the music released, as three of the artists have their own television program, Group Hepsi's show Hepsi 1 on ATV. Murat Boz's show on Star TV and Ayça Tekindor on Kral TV.

Roster
Ayça Tekindor
Gökhan Keser
Hepsi
Murat Boz
Özgür Çevik
Redd (album "50/50")
Zerrin Özer
Nükhet Duru

External links
 Stardium at Discogs
 Stardium on Twitter

Turkish record labels